David Henderson (born September 19, 1942) is an American writer and poet. Henderson was a co-founder of the Black Arts Movement in the 1960s. He has been an active member of New York’s Lower East Side art community for more than 40 years. His work has appeared in many literary publications and anthologies, and he has published four volumes of his own poetry. He is most known for his highly acclaimed biography of rock guitarist, Jimi Hendrix, which he revised and expanded for a second edition which was published in 2009.

Life and work

David Henderson was born on 19 September 1942 in Harlem, New York. He was raised in Harlem, and attended Bronx Community College, Hunter College and the New School for Social Research. Henderson studied writing, communications and Eastern cultures without ever completing a degree. His first published poem appeared in the New York newsweekly Black American in 1960. Henderson became active in the many Black nationalist, arts and anti-war movements, upon moving to the Lower East Side of New York.

Along with other black writers, Henderson founded the Society of Umbra in 1962.

Henderson worked with the National Endowment for the Humanities, the Free Southern Theatre in New Orleans, and the Teachers and Writers Collaborative at Columbia University. He was poet-in-resident and taught at City College of New York. In the late 60's and 70's, he served on the board of directors of the University Without Walls in Berkeley and as artistic consultant to the Berkeley Public Schools while living in California. He also taught English and Afro-American literature at the University of California at Berkeley and San Diego. Later, he taught courses, seminars, and workshops at Long Island University, New York's New School and St. Mark's Poetry Project.

Henderson's poetry has been included in numerous anthologies, including two that were edited by Langston Hughes. He has also contributed to many periodicals including Black American Literature Forum, Black Scholar, Essence, Paris Review, New American Review, Saturday Review, and The New York Times.

Henderson spent over five years researching, interviewing, and writing Jimi Hendrix: Voodoo Child of the Aquarian Age, which was originally published in 1978. It was condensed and revised as 'Scuse Me While I Kiss the Sky in 1981. An expanded and revised edition was published in 2009 as 'Scuse Me While I Kiss the Sky -- Jimi Hendrix, Voodoo Child.

Umbra 
In 1962 Henderson co-founded Umbra, both a literary collective and literary magazine with other Black writers and artists in New York's Lower East Side. Henderson began as co-editor and then later became the general editor. Other notable editors and regular contributors to Umbra magazine include Tom Dent, Ishmael Reed, Brenda Walcott, N. H. Pritchard, Askia Toure, Lorenzo Thomas, Al Haynes and Calvin C. Hernton, among others. Nikki Giovanni and Quincy Troupe were also published in Umbra magazine.

Family 
Henderson has a son, Imetai Malik Henderson. He married Barbara Christian, the scholar and black feminist critic. Together, they have a daughter, Najuma Ide Christian. Henderson and Christian divorced.

Selected works

Books 
Felix of the Silent Forest (poetry), Poets Press, 1967

(Editor) Umbra Anthology 1967-1968, Society of Umbra, 1968

De Mayor of Harlem (poetry), Dutton, 1970; North Atlantic Books, 1985

(Editor) Umbra/Latin Soul 1974-1975, Society of Umbra, 1975

Jimi Hendrix: Voodoo Child of the Aquarian Age, Doubleday, 1978; condensed and revised as 'Scuse Me While I Kiss the Sky: The Life of Jimi Hendrix, Bantam, 1981; revised and reissued, Omnibus, 2003.

The Low East, North Atlantic Books, 1980

Neo-California, North Atlantic Books, 1998

Anthologies 
New Negro Poets: USA, Indiana University, Press, 1964

Where is Vietnam? American Poets Respond, Anchor/Doubleday, 1967

Black Fire: An Anthology of Afro-American Writing, Morrow, 1968

The World Anthology: Poems from Saint Mark's Poetry Project, Bobbs-Merrill, 1969

Poetry of the Negro, 1746-1970, Doubleday, 1970

Open Poetry: Four Anthologies of Expanded Poems. Simon & Schuster, 1973

Moment's Notice: Jazz in Poetry & Prose, Coffee House Press, 1993

Trouble the Water: 250 Years of American-American Poetry, Signet, 1997

Recordings 
New Jazz Poets, Broadside, 1967

Black Poets IV, Pacifica Tape Library, 1973

Poems: Selections, Library of Congress, 1978

(With Sun Ra) "Love in Outer Space," The Singles, Evidence, 1996

(With Ornette Coleman) The Complete Science Fiction Sessions, Columbia/Legacy, 2000

Awards and fellowships

1971: Great Lakes Colleges Association New Writers Award
1992: California Arts Council, New Genre Poetry Grant
1998: Foundation for Contemporary Arts, Grants to Artists award
1999: New York Foundation for the Arts, Artist Fellowship

References

1942 births
Living people
American male poets
American biographers
American male biographers
Black Arts Movement writers